Yeshua or Y'shua (with vowel pointing ) was a common alternative form of the name Yehoshua in later books of the Hebrew Bible and among Jews of the Second Temple period. The name corresponds to the Greek spelling , from which, through the Latin /, comes the English spelling Jesus.

The Hebrew spelling  appears in some later books of the Hebrew Bible. Once for Joshua the son of Nun, and 28 times for Joshua the High Priest and other priests called Jeshua – although these same priests are also given the spelling Joshua in 11 further instances in the books of Haggai and Zechariah. It differs from the usual Hebrew Bible spelling of Joshua, found 218 times in the Hebrew Bible, in the absence of the consonant  and placement of the semivowel  after, not before, the consonant . The name Yeshua is also used in Hebrew historical texts to refer to other Joshuas recorded in Greek texts such as Jesus ben Ananias and Jesus ben Sira.

In English, the name Yeshua is extensively used by followers of Messianic Judaism, whereas East Syriac Christian denominations use the name  in order to preserve the Syriac name of Jesus. The 2004 film The Passion of the Christ, which was made in Aramaic, used Yeshua as the name of Jesus and is the most well-known western Christian work to have done so.

Etymology

Yeshua in Hebrew is a verbal derivative from "to rescue", "to deliver". Among the Jews of the Second Temple period, the Biblical Aramaic/Hebrew name ,  was common: the Hebrew Bible mentions several individuals with this name – while also using their full name Joshua. This name is a feature of biblical books written in the post-Exilic period (Ezra, Nehemiah, and Chronicles) and was found in the Dead Sea Scrolls, though Haggai and Zechariah prefer the spelling Joshua. It is often translated as "He saves," to conform with Matthew 1:21: "She will bear a Son; and you shall call His name Jesus, for He will save His people from their sins".

The name  occurs in the Hebrew of the Old Testament at verses Ezra 2:2, 2:6, 2:36, 2:40, 3:2, 3:8, 3:9, 3:10, 3:18, 4:3, 8:33; Nehemiah 3:19, 7:7, 7:11, 7:39, 7:43, 8:7, 8:17, 9:4, 9:5, 11:26, 12:1, 12:7, 12:8, 12:10, 12:24, 12:26; 1 Chronicles 24:11; and 2 Chronicles 31:15, and also in Aramaic at Ezra 5:2. In Nehemiah 8:17 this name refers to Joshua son of Nun, the successor of Moses, as leader of the Israelites. In earlier English (where adaptations of names of Biblical figures were generally based on the Latin Vulgate forms), Yeshua was generally transcribed identically to "Jesus" in English.

According to the Book of Numbers verse 13:16, the name of Joshua, the son of Nun was originally , and the name  is usually spelled the same but with a  added at the beginning.

Similarly, the Septuagint renders Ben Sira as saying (in the Greek form of the name): " the son of Naue [Yehoshua Ben Nun] who according to his name became great unto [the] salvation/deliverance of his chosen ones" (Ben Sira 46:1–2). However, Ben Sira originally wrote in Hebrew in the second century BC, and the only extant Hebrew manuscript for this passage has "in his days", not "according to his name" (which would be  in Hebrew), and thus does not comment on the name Yehoshua as connoting  "deliverance": "Yehoshua Ben Nun, who was formed to be in his days a great deliverer for his chosen ones".

Archaeological evidence

One ossuary of the around twenty known with the name Yeshua, Rahmani No.9, discovered by Ezra Sukenik in 1931, has "Yeshu... Yeshua ben Yosef." The "Yeshu..." may have been scratched out. Two Jewish magical incantation bowls have been discovered both bearing variant spellings of Yeshua.

Apart from the "Yeshua... Yeshua ben Yosef" ossuary, the only other known evidence for the existence of a Yeshua form prior to the material related to Jesus in the Talmud, is a graffito which Joachim Jeremias identified in Bethesda in 1966, but which is now filled in.

Pronunciation
Thus it is pronounced  in Modern Hebrew.

The Hebrew name of Jesus is probably pronounced , although this is uncertain and depends on the reconstruction of several ancient Hebrew dialects.

Qimron describes the general linguistic environment of Hebrew dialects by the time of the Dead Sea Scrolls. Thus Hebrew pronunciations became less stable when two successive vowels were no longer separated by a consonant . For example, the Dead Sea Scrolls spell the Hebrew word  ('seen') variously, recording both pronunciations: reduced  and expanded .

The Hebrew name Yehoshua generally reduced to Yeshua, but an expanded Yehoshua is possible, especially in Galilee, whose traditional orthography possibly reflects this.

Original name for Jesus
The English name Jesus derives from the Late Latin name , which transliterates the Koine Greek name  .

In the Septuagint and other Greek-language Jewish texts, such as the writings of Josephus and Philo of Alexandria,  is the standard Koine Greek form used to translate both of the Hebrew names: Yehoshua and Yeshua. (It was even used in the Septuagint to translate the name Hoshea in one of the three verses where this referred to Joshua the son of Nun—Deuteronomy 32:44.)

During the second Temple period (beginning 538 BC–70 AD), Yeshua first became a known form of the name Yehoshua. All occurrences of Yeshua in the Hebrew Bible are in 1 Chronicles 24:11, 2 Chronicles 31:15, Ezra, and Nehemiah where it is transliterated into English as Jeshua. Two of these men (Joshua the son of Nun and Joshua the High Priest) are mentioned in other books of the Hebrew Bible where they are instead called Yehoshua  (transliterated into English as Joshua).

The earlier form Yehoshua did not disappear, however, and remained in use as well. In the post-exilic books, Joshua the son of Nun is called both Yeshua bin-Nun (Nehemiah 8:17) and Yehoshua (1 Chronicles 7:27). The short form Yeshua was used for Jesus ben Sirach in Hebrew fragments of the Wisdom of Sirach. (Some concern remains over whether these fragments faithfully represent the original Hebrew text or are instead a later translation back into Hebrew.) The earlier form Yehoshua saw revived usage from the Hasmonean period onwards, although the name Yeshua is still found in letters from the time of the Bar Kokhba Revolt (132–135 AD).

In the documentary The Lost Tomb of Jesus, archeologist Amos Kloner stated that the name Yeshua was then a popular form of the name Yehoshua and was "one of the common names in the time of the Second Temple." In discussing whether it was remarkable to find a tomb with the name of Jesus (the particular ossuary in question bears the inscription "Yehuda bar Yeshua"), he pointed out that the name had been found 71 times in burial caves from that time period.

Thus, both the full form Yehoshua and the abbreviated form Yeshua were in use during the Gospel period – and in relation to the same person, as in the Hebrew Bible references to Yehoshua/Yeshua son of Nun, and Yehoshua/Yeshua the high priest in the days of Ezra.

East Syriac 

The Aramaic Bibles and the Syriac Peshitta preserve these same spellings. Current scholarly consensus posits that the New Testament texts were translated from the Greek, but this theory is not supported directly at least by the name for Jesus, which is not a simple transliteration of the Greek form as would otherwise be expected, as Greek did not have a "sh"  sound, and substituted ; and likewise lacked and therefore omitted the final . Moreover, Eusebius (early 4th century) reports that Papias of Hierapolis (early 2nd century) reports that Jesus's disciple Matthew the Evangelist wrote a gospel "in the Hebrew language". (Scholars typically argue the word "Hebrew" in the New Testament refers to Aramaic; however, others have attempted to refute this view.) The Hebrew final letter  is equivalent to final  in Syriac varieties of Aramaic. It can be argued that Aramaic speakers who used this name had a continual connection to the Aramaic-speakers in communities founded by the apostles and other students of Jesus, thus independently preserved his historical name Yeshuuʿ and the Eastern dialectical . Those churches following the East Syriac Rite still preserve the name .

Yeshua, Yehoshua, and Yeshu in the Talmud
In the Talmud, only one reference is made to the spelling Yeshuaʿ, in verbatim quotation from the Hebrew Bible regarding Jeshua son of Jozadak (elsewhere called Joshua son of Josedech). The Talmud does refer to several people named Yehoshua from before (e.g. Joshua ben Perachyah) and after Jesus (e.g., Joshua ben Hananiah). In references to Jesus in the Talmud, however, where the name occurs, it is rendered Yeshu, which is a name reserved in Aramaic and Hebrew literature from the early medieval period until today, solely for Jesus, not for other Joshuas. Some scholars, such as Maier (1978), regard the two named "Yeshuʿ" texts in the Talmud (Sanhedrin 43a and 107b) to be later amendments, and not original.

Rabbinical commentary on the difference Yeshuʿ/Yeshuaʿ
In general rabbinical sources, the name Yeshuʿ is used, and this is the form to which some named references to Jesus in the Talmud as Yeshu occur in some manuscripts of the Babylonian Talmud, though some scholars, such as Maier (1978) have argued that the presence of the name Yeshuʿ in these texts is a late interpolation.

The name Yeshu is unknown in archeological sources and inscriptions, except for one ossuary found in Israel which has an inscription where someone has started to write first "Yeshu.." and then written "Yeshuaʿ bar Yehosef" beneath it. There are 24 other ossuaries to various Yeshuas and Yehoshuas. None of the others have Yeshu. All other "Joshuas" in the Talmud, rabbinical writings, modern Hebrew, are always Yeshua or Yehoshua. There are no undisputed examples of any Aramaic or Hebrew text where Yeshu refers to anyone else than Jesus.

Some of rabbinical sources comment on the reasons for the missing  from Yeshu, as opposed to the Hebrew Bible Yeshuaʿ and Yehoshuaʿ. (Modena was a 17th-century polemicist and does not have reliable linguistic evidence for the claim.) Against this David Flusser suggested that the name Yeshu itself was "in no way abusive," but "almost certainly" a Galilean dialect form of Yeshua.

See also

 Aramaic of Jesus
 Isa (name)
 Joseph (name)
 Josiah
 Tikkun olam
 Yahshua
 Yahshuah

References

Names of Jesus
Hebrew-language names